Love Lies is a 1932 British musical comedy film directed by Lupino Lane and starring Stanley Lupino, Dorothy Boyd and Jack Hobbs. It was made by British International Pictures at Elstree Studios. It was based on Stanley Lupino's own hit 1929 stage musical.

Cast
Stanley Lupino as Jerry Walker  
Dorothy Boyd as Joyce  
Jack Hobbs as Rolly Rider 
Dennis Hoey as Cyrus Watt 
Binnie Barnes as Junetta 
Sebastian Smith as Nicholas Wich 
Wallace Lupino as Lord Lletgoe 
Arty Ash as Butler 
Charles Courtneidge as Inspector 
Denis O'Neil

References

Bibliography
Low, Rachael. Filmmaking in 1930s Britain. George Allen & Unwin, 1985.
Wood, Linda. British Films, 1927–1939. British Film Institute, 1986.

External links

1932 films
1932 musical comedy films
British musical comedy films
Films shot at British International Pictures Studios
Films directed by Lupino Lane
British black-and-white films
1930s English-language films
1930s British films